Acacia ingrata is a shrub belonging to the genus Acacia and the subgenus Phyllodineae that is endemic to south western Australia.

Description
It has light grey coloured bark on glabrous to lightly haired branchlets with persistent stipule bases appearing as tooth-like projections. It produces cream-white flowers from September to January. The sparse spherical flower-heads contain five to seven cream to white flowers.

Distribution
It is native to an area along the coast in the South West and Goldfields-Esperance regions of Western Australia where it grows in gravelly lateritic clay-loam and sandy soils. The bulk of the population is found on the south coast between Mid Mount Barren near Ravensthorpe in the west and Young River in the east with an isolated population found on the west coast around Busselton.

See also
List of Acacia species

References

ingrata
Acacias of Western Australia
Plants described in 1864
Taxa named by George Bentham